In mathematics, an unordered pair or pair set is a set of the form {a, b}, i.e. a set having two elements a and b with no particular relation between them, where {a, b} = {b, a}. In contrast, an ordered pair (a, b) has a as its first element and b as its second element, which means (a, b) ≠ (b, a). 

While the two elements of an ordered pair (a, b) need not be distinct, modern authors only call {a, b} an unordered pair if a ≠ b.
But for a few authors a singleton is also considered an unordered pair, although today, most would say that {a, a} is a multiset. It is typical to use the term unordered pair even in the situation where the elements a and b could be equal, as long as this equality has not yet been established.

A set with precisely two elements is also called a 2-set or (rarely) a binary set.

An unordered pair is a finite set; its cardinality (number of elements) is 2 or (if the two elements are not distinct) 1.

In axiomatic set theory, the existence of unordered pairs is required by an axiom, the axiom of pairing.

More generally, an unordered n-tuple is a set of the form {a1, a2,... an}.

Notes

References
 .

Basic concepts in set theory